Sven Tuuva the Hero is a 1958 Finnish war film written and directed by Edvin Laine. It was entered into the 9th Berlin International Film Festival. The film is loosely based on the poem "Sven Dufva" which is part of The Tales of Ensign Stål, written by Johan Ludvig Runeberg, the national poet of Finland.

Cast

 Veikko Sinisalo as Sven
 Edvin Laine as Sergeant Ukko Tuuva
 Fanni Halonen as Äiti Tuuva, Tuuva's mother
 Salme Karppinen as Kaarina
 Leif Wager as Johan August Sandels
 Kauko Helovirta as Duncker
 Mirjam Novero as Rva Duncker
 Aarne Laine as Örn
 Leevi Kuuranne as Gustav IV Adolf
 Tommi Rinne as Spets

References

External links

1958 films
1950s Finnish-language films
Finnish black-and-white films
Films directed by Edvin Laine